165 Loreley is a main-belt asteroid that was discovered by C. H. F. Peters on August 9, 1876, in Clinton, New York and named after the Lorelei, a figure in German folklore.

In the late 1990s, a network of astronomers worldwide gathered light curve data that was ultimately used to derive the spin states and shape models of 10 new asteroids, including (165) Loreley. The light curve of this asteroid varies by no more than 0.2 in magnitude, while the derived shape model shows multiple flat spots on the surface.

Between 2003 and 2021, 165 Loreley has been observed to occult thirteen stars.

The asteroid has an oblate shape with a size ratio of 1.26 ± 0.08 between the major and minor axes, as determined from the W. M. Keck Observatory.

References

External links 
 
 

000165
Discoveries by Christian Peters
Named minor planets
000165
000165
000165
18760809